Bang Yi Ruea is a khwaeng (sub-district) in Thon Buri district, Thonburi side of Bangkok. It has a total area of 1.523 km2 (round about 0.588 mi2).

History
Originally, this area was called "Bang Sakae" (บางสะแก), that refers to "hamlet of combretum", because it's an area adjacent to the canal. Combretums are densely populated that can be used as a hiding place as well. It's surrounded by three waterways viz Khlong Bang Luang (คลองบางหลวง; Bang Luang canal–better known as Khlong Bangkok Yai), Khlong Bang Nam Chon (คลองบางน้ำชน; Bang Nam Chon canal), Khlong Tha Phra (คลองท่าพระ; Tha Phra canal). In the Thonburi period corresponds to the days of King Taksin. This area was used as a hiding place for firing to the Burmese army's boats. Hence the name "Bang Ying Ruea" (บังยิงเรือ), literally means "hiding to fire a boat", and wrong pronunciation to "Bang Yi Ruea" finally. Including as the home of the Mon who escaped war from Burma.

Later on, in the Rattanakosin period. Bang Yi Ruea was an amphoe (อำเภอ; district) under the administration of Thonburi province named "Amphoe Ratchakhrue" (อำเภอราชคฤห์) and changed its name to Bang Yi Ruea in 1916. Later on, in 1939, amphoe Bang Yi Ruea was renamed to Amphoe Thon Buri to commemorate King Taksin, and it has been modified several times until the sub-district status as today.

Places
Wongwian Yai & King Taskin Memorial
Thon Buri District Office
Talat Phlu
Bang Yi Ruea Junction
Bang Yi Reua Metropolitan Police Station
 Naowa Chamnian Bridge–the beginning of Petchkasem road, the longest road in Thailand
Wat Welurachin
Wat Rajkrueh (Wat Bang Yi Ruea Nai, Wat Bang Yi Ruea Nuea)
Wat Chantharam (Wat Klang Talat Phlu)
Wat Intharam (Wat Tai, Wat Bang Yi Ruea Tai)
Masjid Suan Phlu

References 

Thon Buri district
Subdistricts of Bangkok
History of Bangkok